The Babai is a Pashtun tribe also known as Babi. Their traditional primary homeland is in Qalat, Zabul, located in Southern Afghanistan and Kandahar. Babai is the son of Ghorghasht & brother of Kakar (Dani) & Mando, largely settled in Afghanistan, Pakistan and India.

The tribe speaks the most archaic and soft dialect Pashto language, referred to as Kandahari Pashto dialect or the Southern Dialect.

The rulers and nawabs of Junagadh State, India, belong to the Babai tribe.

Notables 

Muhammad Dilawar Khanji Babi, 14th Governor of Sindh, Pakistan, and Nawab of Junagadh State
Abdul Aziz Khan Babi, Khan of Babi Tribe and possessor of Mahal (Jo-e-Babi), Quetta, Balochistan
Parveen Babi, Indian actress
Basir Babai, News reporter of Radio Television Afghanistan's Balkh province branch

See also 
 Pashtun tribes
 Pathans of Gujarat
List of Muslim dynasties
Babi dynasty
 Nawab of Junagarh

References

Ethnic groups in Zabul Province
Pashto-language surnames
Pakistani names